State Route 160 (SR 160) is a state highway in East Tennessee that has both four-lane expressway and two-lane rural collector sections. It serves as a arterial bypass route of US 11E/SR 34 in the city of Morristown in Hamblen County.

Route description

Hamblen County

SR 160 begins as a primary highway at an intersection with US 11E/SR 34 (W Andrew Johnson Highway) in a concurrency with SR 342 in Morristown, heading southeastward as a 4-lane divided highway, serving essentially as a southern bypass of Morristown. SR 342 (Alpha Valley Home Road) exits after SR 160 curves more eastwardly, and has an intersection with SR 66 (Merchants Greene Boulevard) shortly afterwards. SR 160 continues east to have an interchange with SR 343 (S Cumberland Street) before coming to an interchange with US 25E/SR 32 (S Davy Crockett Parkway; Exit 1 on US 25E). SR 160 then leaves Morristown and has an intersection with SR 113 before coming to an interchange with Interstate 81 (Exit 12 on I-81) in Lowland, where it turns secondary, narrows to 2-lanes, and continues through farmland before crossing the Nolichucky River into Cocke County.

Cocke County

SR 160 enters the mountains and passes by Briarwood Ranch Safari Park before passing through Bybee as it exits the mountains and re enters farmland. The highway then winds its way southeast along the banks of the French Broad River  to enter Community Newport and come to an end at an intersection with US 321/SR 35 east of downtown.

History
Prior to the extension of the highway, SR 160's original northern terminus was at TN State Route 343, also known as South Cumberland Street and Old US Highway 25E. Construction of the four-laned section began in 1990 and it took roughly two years to complete, passing through a number of hills and valleys, requiring extensive bridges. The first few miles of the highway took over part of Tennessee State Route 342. The four lane section goes from US 11E in Morristown to 1.7 miles south of Interstate 81.

Junction list

References

160
Transportation in Hamblen County, Tennessee
Transportation in Cocke County, Tennessee